Looney v. District of Columbia, 113 U.S. 258 (1885), was a U.S. Supreme Court case testing whether a government contractor could sue for outstanding payment when those debts had already been sold off to other parties.  The court ruled a street contractor could not both sell the debts at a discount as a security and also sue District of Columbia for the difference in what they were owed.

Background
The case involves a written contract made on September 11, 1872, between Dennis Looney and the Board of Public Works of the District of Columbia wherein Looney agreed to provide  materials and labor and to grade and gravel Fourteenth Street East between B Street South and Boundary, in the City of Washington; agreeing to punctually pay in cash the workmen employed by him with the Board of Public Works paying him the amount found to be due to him periodically according to the contract. Looney held to his part of the contract terms. After evaluating the work and the account statements during the progress and completion of the work, it was calculated Looney was due $27,364.75; but due to a mistake in the calculations of which neither party was aware, this amount was $500.00 too much, Looney received standard certificates by the Auditor of the Board of Public Works in different sums, some of which Looney assigned to others as payment to them.

According to the case syllabus:

Decision
Justice Gray delivered the opinion of the court, which stated:

The judgment was affirmed.

See also
List of United States Supreme Court cases, volume 113

References

External links
 

United States Supreme Court cases
United States Supreme Court cases of the Waite Court
United States securities case law
Government bonds issued by the United States
Government of the District of Columbia
1885 in United States case law